Sara Ilonka Däbritz (born 15 February 1995) is a German professional footballer who plays as a midfielder for Division 1 Féminine club Lyon and the Germany national team.

Club career
Däbritz began her junior career at SpVgg SV Weiden and SC Freiburg before joining the senior team of SC Freiburg in 2012. In 2015, she moved to Bayern Munich. In 2019, she agreed a move to Paris Saint-Germain. During the 2020/21 season, she appeared 18 times, scoring three goals and providing eight assists as Paris won the Division 1 Féminine title.  In June 2022, she signed a contract with Olympique Lyonnais to keep her at the club until the 2025 season.

International career
On 29 June 2013, Däbritz made her debut at senior level coming in as a second-half substitute during a friendly match against Japan. She was called up to be part of the national team for the successful campaign at the UEFA Women's Euro 2013. In 2014, she was part of the Germany U-20 at the 2014 FIFA U-20 Women's World Cup, achieving another title with a contribution of five goals for which she received the Bronze Shoe. Named for Germany's national squad for the 2015 FIFA Women's World Cup, she scored her first senior goal during the tournament's match against Ivory Coast.

She was part of the squad for the 2016 Summer Olympics, where Germany won the gold medal.

At the 2019 Women's World Cup, she scored a goal in Germany's 1–0, and 4-0 wins over Spain and South Africa, earning the player of the match award on both occasions. She would add another goal to her world cup total as she scored in Germany's 3–0 triumph over Nigeria, bringing her goal total to three for the tournament.

Career statistics

Scores and results list Germany's goal tally first, score column indicates score after each Däbritz goal.

Honours
Bayern München
Bundesliga: 2015–16

Paris Saint-Germain
 Division 1 Féminine: 2020–21
 Coupe de France féminine: 2021–22

Germany
UEFA Women's Championship: 2013, runner-up: 2022
Summer Olympic Games: 2016
Algarve Cup: 2014
Germany U20
FIFA U-20 Women's World Cup: 2014
Germany U17
UEFA Women's Under-17 Championship: 2012

Individual
FIFA U-20 Women's World Cup Bronze Shoe: 2014
Fritz Walter Medal: Bronze in 2012, Silver in 2013, Gold in 2014
Silbernes Lorbeerblatt: 2016

References

External links

 
 
 
 
 
 
 Sara Däbritz at DFB 
 Sara Däbritz Player German domestic football stats at DFB 
 
 
 Sara Däbritz at Soccerdonna.de 

1995 births
Living people
German women's footballers
German expatriate women's footballers
Germany women's international footballers
German expatriate sportspeople in France
Expatriate women's footballers in France
Association football midfielders
SC Freiburg (women) players
FC Bayern Munich (women) players
2015 FIFA Women's World Cup players
Women's association football midfielders
Olympic medalists in football
Footballers at the 2016 Summer Olympics
Olympic gold medalists for Germany
Medalists at the 2016 Summer Olympics
People from Amberg
Sportspeople from the Upper Palatinate
Frauen-Bundesliga players
Footballers from Bavaria
Olympic footballers of Germany
UEFA Women's Championship-winning players
2019 FIFA Women's World Cup players
Paris Saint-Germain Féminine players
Division 1 Féminine players
UEFA Women's Euro 2022 players
UEFA Women's Euro 2017 players